The Dallas Arboretum and Botanical Garden is a  botanical garden located at 8525 Garland Road in East Dallas, Texas, on the southeastern shore of White Rock Lake.

History
The majority of the grounds were once part of a  estate known as Rancho Encinal, built for geophysicist Everette Lee DeGolyer and his wife Nell. Mrs. DeGolyer's interests included her extensive flower gardens. The DeGolyer Home is listed on the National Register of Historic Places. Since 1976, the DeGolyer estate has formed a portion of the Dallas Arboretum & Botanical Gardens.

The  Spanish-style DeGolyer Home was completed in 1940. The DeGolyer Restaurant/Loggia is located in the DeGolyer Home, overlooks White Rock Lake and the fountains and landscapes of A Woman's Garden. Also located on the grounds is an outdoor concert stage, picnic areas, and the internationally acclaimed  Rory Meyers Children's Adventure Garden with 17 interactive indoor and outdoor galleries.

In September 2002, Arboretum facilities were expanded with the opening of the new visitors center, named after Dallas developer Trammell Crow. At night, one may view downtown Dallas with the skyscraper lights reflecting upon the water in A Tasteful Place, the  food and herb garden and cooking pavilion and kitchen.

Named gardens
The Arboretum opened in 1984. There are 19 named gardens.

The Trammell Crow Visitor Education Pavilion and Entry Plaza
Built with native Texas limestone and wood and copper sheathing, this structure serves as the gateway to the gardens. The Scott K. Ginsburg Family Plaza and Junkins Fountain is located at the entrance.

Margaret Elisabeth Jonsson Color Garden

Designed by Naud Burnett II, the  Margaret Elisabeth Jonsson Color Garden features beds of seasonal flowers and plants. The Waterwise display, donated by Region IV of the Texas Nursery and Landscape Association, provides a location for home gardeners to learn how to install and manage a low-water landscape. The Palmer Fern Dell has a collection of ferns, camellias, azaleas and other perennials and shrubs.

A Woman’s Garden
A Woman's Garden is a gift from the Women's Council of Dallas. This garden features terraced walkways. Phase 1 of this  formal garden was designed in 1997 by landscape architect Morgan Wheelock. A Woman's Garden is composed of several smaller outdoor garden "rooms" including the Pecan Parterre and the Poetry Garden, which features a sunken garden of roses.Phase 2, which opened to the public in the spring of 2006, was designed by Dallas landscape architect and Texas Tech University graduate Warren Johnson. It has a native Texas limestone bridge, a 140-foot hanging garden, and a wellspring surrounded by Dawn Redwoods. These two gardens were designed to celebrate the strength, courage, creativity and nurturing demeanor of women. Guests’ favorite aspects of this garden are the various sculptures, the vista across the infinity pool and the flower water in the fountains and features.

The Nancy Rutchik Red Maple Rill
This  garden includes a collection of over 80 varieties of signature Japanese Maples planted along the stream.

It was designed by Rowland Jackson of Newman, Jackson, Bieberstein, with construction services provided by The Beck Group. Key design elements include an entry off the Paseo de Flores and a gathering plaza that overlooks a re-circulating creek and numerous waterfalls. Opened in fall 2011, the area also includes a series of paved walkways and a stone bridge connecting the Martin Rutchik Concert Stage to the Magnolia Allee. A large weeping Japanese maple, nearly 100 years old, is in the center of the garden.

The Lyda Bunker Hunt Paseo de Flores
Commonly referred to as simply The Paseo, this pathway serves as the central walkway of the Dallas Arboretum and Botanical Garden.

Designed by Luis Santana, the path begins at the Trammell Crow Visitor Education Pavilion and concludes near Fogelson Fountain, which was donated by the late Greer Garson in memory of her husband, Buddy.

Boswell Family Garden
A stacked stone wall serves as the backbone of this garden, along with a range of rose varieties. Donated in 2004 by George Boswell and designed by landscape architect Warren Johnson of Fallcreek Gardens, The Boswell Family Garden comprises the area north of the McCasland Sunken Garden and is surrounded by the Gazebo, Octagonal Fountain and Magnolia Allee. An overlook offers a view of White Rock Lake and the surrounding gardens.

McCasland Sunken Garden

The Chico y Chica de la Playa sculpture and accompanying fountain provide the setting for many weddings.

Tom and Phyllis McCasland's 2006 contribution, the McCasland Sunken Garden, designed by Warren Johnson of Fallcreek Gardens, is a renovation and upgrade of the original Sunken Garden. The central aisle, lined with Italian jardinières, leads down a series of steps toward a grass court surrounded by seasonal plantings.

The Eugenia Leftwich Palmer Fern Dell

More than 90 varieties of ferns, camellias, azaleas and mature trees border a brook, which winds throughout this mini-garden. The Palmer Fern Dell, designed by Naud Burnett II, is located within the Jonsson Color Garden.

The Nancy Clements Seay Magnolia Glade
The Magnolia Glade features a waterway and lily pond amid a collection of flowers. Along with her husband Austin, Pauline Neuhoff dedicated this quiet garden to honor her mother. The Nancy Clements Seay Magnolia Glade features green grass, white blooms, and the sounds of running water. Designed by Landscape Architect Warren Hill Johnson, the glade takes on different colors and textures throughout the year. Framed by the 45-foot magnolias of the Dallas Arboretum's Magnolia Allee, the glade is enclosed by 35 new ‘Teddy Bear’ southern magnolias, as well as butterfly Japanese Maples, large white flowering camellias, and loquats. The Magnolia Glade is a popular places for picnics, and children enjoy the stream that runs through the garden.

Nancy’s Garden
Nancy's Garden is blanketed by pink crape myrtles and azaleas, and is filled seasonally with pastel annual color. Located within the DeGolyer Gardens, this space was originally Nell DeGolyer's personal garden. In 1992, the garden was renovated and dedicated to the children of Nancy Dillard Lyon. The Bill Dillard Family renovated the plantings and lighting of this peaceful area, which now includes child-sized benches as well as the sculpture Thank Heaven for Little Girls by Gary Price.

Crape Myrtle Allee
Crape myrtle trees enclose a stone walkway to create this garden. This natural tunnel leads visitors to the "toad corners" water feature, with two polliwog basins at the Paseo entry. Opened to the public in 1994, Crape Myrtle Allee was originally funded by the Communities Foundation. Dedicated to John and Thelma Black by their daughter Peggy Braecklein. The Allee features a new lane of crape myrtle trees, which replaced the original trees planted by the DeGolyers. Paved with Pennsylvania bluestone, the Allee runs from the Paseo to Toad Corners.

Chandler Lindsley Shadow Garden
The Chandler Lindsley Shadow Garden is filled with pathways. Azaleas border the pathways providing color during the spring, while a row of  magnolias provides a backdrop for the garden.

Pecan Grove

Pecan Grove serves as the centerpiece of the festival, Autumn at the Arboretum. In spring, over 100 blooming Japanese Cherry Trees surround the Pecan Grove. In fall, over 50,000 pumpkins, gourds and squash come together to form the Pumpkin Village at the Arboretum.

The Martha Brooks Camellia Garden
This garden features 200 camellias and over 30 different cultivars. Located along the Paseo de Flores, the Camellia Garden was designed by Dallas landscape architect and Texas Tech University graduate Warren Hill Johnson. The Martha Brooks Camellia garden was funded by the employees of Central and South West Corporation and was dedicated to the wife of retired CEO Dick Brooks. This addition to the Arboretum was opened in January 2000.

DeGolyer Gardens
The 21,000-square-foot home of Mr. and Mrs. Everette DeGolyer serves as the centerpiece to this garden. Landscape architects Arthur and Marie Berger designed the  DeGolyer Gardens for the DeGolyer family in 1940. Many of the original garden features remain, including the Magnolia Allee, the Sunken Garden and the Octagonal Fountain. In 2012, the existing entry landscape was replaced with a new design featuring tropical plants and palms. The DeGolyer House is listed on the National Register of Historic Places as well as the Texas Register of Historic Places.

Lay Family Garden
The Lay Family Garden (formally known as the Lay Ornamental Garden) is a  garden filled with hundreds of perennials and woody plants. A garden at the south end of the property, it is a reinterpretation of the Lay Ornamental Garden, a gift from the family of Mimi Lay Hodges and Herman Lay. The Lay Family Garden was named for Herman Lay, co-founder of Frito-Lay.

Rose Mary Haggar Rose Garden
Located within the DeGolyer Gardens, this pocket rose garden contains over 200 Hybrid Tea Roses of 16 different varieties.

The Trial Gardens

In 2002, the Dallas Arboretum became the 31st "All-America Selections Trial Garden". The Trial Gardens opened to the public in March 2003. The Trial Gardens at the Dallas Arboretum were created for the purpose of expanding research efforts and providing information to the public. The focus of the trial program is to grow and evaluate many different plants in the drastic climate of the Metroplex and North Central Texas. Information generated from the trials is provided to commercial plant producers, retailers and home gardeners. Between 3,000 and 5,000 plants are trialed yearly from over 150 plant breeding companies.

The Rory Meyers Children's Adventure Garden
The Rory Meyers Children's Adventure Garden was designed to connect children with nature. The Children's Garden is funded with support from the City of Dallas and private and corporate donors. Named by the family of Rory Meyers, the Garden encompasses several galleries, each designed to be age-specific. There are several lawsuits associated with former employees of the Children's Garden.

See also

List of botanical gardens in the United States
National Register of Historic Places listings in Dallas County, Texas
Recorded Texas Historic Landmarks in Dallas County
List of Dallas Landmarks

References

External links

Dallas Arboretum Website
Arboretum pictures, pictures of the Arboretum from whiterocklake.net

Arboreta in Texas
Botanical gardens in Texas
Parks in Dallas
National Register of Historic Places in Dallas
Dallas Landmarks
Spanish Colonial Revival architecture in Texas